John Barradell  is the Town Clerk of London and Chief Executive of the Corporation of the City of London. He was appointed in 2012, when he succeeded Chris Duffield; he was the only candidate considered for the position.

Barradell had a career in the information and communication technology sector, playing a variety of marketing management roles for such companies as Unisys and Hewlett Packard. He also rose through the ranks of the Specials Police Force to Chief Officer, and was appointed Officer of the Order of the British Empire (OBE) in the 2008 New Year Honours for services to the police. In 2002, he began working for Westminster City Council, rising to the position of Deputy Chief Executive there by 2006. In 2009, he went to work for Brighton and Hove Council.

He is chair of the Sir Simon Milton Foundation, a charitable organisation set up to promote the vision of society developed by the Conservative politician Simon Milton, who was leader of Westminster City Council from 2000 to 2008.

Replacement
Ian Thomas, CBE, will become the 51st Town Clerk of London in February 2023, as the ten-year tenure of John Barradell ends on 31 December 2022.

References

Year of birth missing (living people)
Living people
Metropolitan Special Constabulary officers
Town Clerks of London
Officers of the Order of the British Empire